Haditha is a district in Al Anbar Governorate, Iraq.  It is centred on the city of Haditha. There is a huge lake near the city and a dam in front of it called  Haditha Dam, contains six hydroelectric stations, two drainage outlets, and a waterway that includes six holes controlled by radial gates. This dam feeds the electricity needs of Anbar cities.

Cities
Haditha
Barwanah
Haqlaniyah
Aloos
Alzawiha

Districts of Al Anbar Governorate